Charles d'Ambleville (died 6 July 1637 in Rouen) was a French composer. His Octonarium sacrum (1634) is a set of five-part verses for the Magnificat, using all eight tones, in fugal style. He also composed the Messe des Jésuites à Pékin (Mass of the Beijing Jesuits).  He died at Rouen.

References

External links
 (Messe des Jésuites à Pékin)

1637 deaths
French male classical composers
French Baroque composers
Year of birth unknown
Place of birth unknown
17th-century classical composers
17th-century male musicians